André Mallarmé (6 August 1877 – 8 April 1956) was a French politician.

Mallarmé was born in Bouzaréah, Algeria.  He represented the Republican-Socialist Party from 1924 to 1928 and the Independent Radicals from 1928 to 1939 in the Chamber of Deputies. He was Senator from 1939 to 1940. He was Minister of Posts, Telegraphs and Telephones in 1930 and 1934 and Minister of National Education from 1934 to 1935.

References
 Sycomore, Assemblée nationale

1877 births
1956 deaths
People from Algiers
People of French Algeria
Pieds-Noirs
Republican-Socialist Party politicians
Independent Radical politicians
Government ministers of France
French Ministers of National Education
French Ministers of Posts, Telegraphs, and Telephones
Members of the 13th Chamber of Deputies of the French Third Republic
Members of the 14th Chamber of Deputies of the French Third Republic
Members of the 15th Chamber of Deputies of the French Third Republic
Members of the 16th Chamber of Deputies of the French Third Republic
French Senators of the Third Republic
Senators of French Algeria